Reginald George Thomas (2 January 1912 – 16 March 1983) was an English professional footballer who played as a full-back in the Football League for Southampton in the 1930s.

Football career
Ellison was born in Weymouth, Dorset and as a youth played for various clubs in his home town. In September 1930, he joined Southampton as an amateur, signing a professional contract in December.
 
Described as a "hard-tackling full-back", he was used as cover for long-serving Bill Adams. He spent most of his time with the Saints in the reserves, making 83 appearances in his four years at The Dell. His first-team debut came on 12 March 1932, when he took the place of Adams at right-back for the game against Bradford City, with Adams moving to the left in the absence of Arthur Roberts; the match was lost 1–0. Thomas retained his place for the next seven matches, before Charlie Sillett took over at left-back.

Thomas remained with the Saints for another two years, although he never made another first-team appearance, but was confined to the reserves, for whom he made 83 appearances.

In the summer of 1934, Thomas left professional football to join the Metropolitan Police Service, turning out occasionally for various non-league clubs across southern England.

References

External links
Career details on www.11v11.com

1912 births
1983 deaths
Sportspeople from Weymouth
Footballers from Dorset
English footballers
Association football defenders
Southampton F.C. players
Folkestone F.C. players
Bath City F.C. players
Guildford City F.C. players
Sittingbourne F.C. players
Margate F.C. players
Ashford United F.C. players
Dartford F.C. players
English Football League players